Bouquet Bay is a bay, 7 miles wide, lying between Liege Island and the N part of Brabant Island, in the Palmer Archipelago. Discovered by the FrAE, 1903–05, and named by Charcot for Jean Bouquet de la Grye, French hydrographic engineer and a member of the commission which published the scientific results of the expedition.

External links 
 Bouquet Bay
 Bouquet Bay
 Bouquet Bay Copernix satellite image

References 

Bays of the Palmer Archipelago
Brabant Island